Muqabil Khan, also known as Maqbul Khan,  was a wazir and sar-e-lashkar of Srihat (Sylhet) in 1440. He was the wazir of Sylhet in 1440 during the reign of Sultan Nasiruddin Mahmud Shah of the restored Ilyas Shahi dynasty. It is unknown when Khan's office started and how long he was wazir for. After his death, he was buried in the dargah of Shah Jalal, to the west of Jalal's tomb. There is a gap between Haydar Ghazi, wazir of Sylhet in the mid-fourteenth century, and Khan as the governors of Sylhet during that time is unknown. The next known successor of Muqabil Khan was Khurshid Khan who governed Sylhet in the 1460s.

See also
Farhad Khan
History of Sylhet
Lutfullah Shirazi

References

Rulers of Sylhet
15th-century Indian monarchs
15th-century Indian Muslims
Bengal Sultanate officers